The 2003 Men's Oceania Cup was the third edition of the men's field hockey tournament. It was held from 17–21 September in Christchurch and Wellington.

The tournament served as a qualifier for the 2004 Olympic Games.

Australia won the tournament for the third time, defeating New Zealand in the three–game series, 3–0.

Results
All times are local (NZST).

Pool

Fixtures

Statistics

Final standings

Goalscorers

References

External links

2003
2003 in field hockey
2003 in Australian sport
2003 in New Zealand sport
2003 Oceania Cup